Jitse Groen (born 2 June 1978) is a Dutch businessman and the founder of Takeaway.com, a food delivery platform. He is the chief executive (CEO) of Takeaway.com, and, since 2020, also the CEO of Just Eat following its merger with Takeaway.com.

Early life 
Groen was born in Delft in 1978 and raised in the villages Kolhorn and 't Veld. His mother worked as a teacher and his father was an automation engineer. He studied business information technology at the University of Twente, but never completed his bachelor's degree.

Career
Groen founded Takeaway.com (originally known as Thuisbezorgd.nl) in 2000, at the age of 21, while he was a student in Business Information Technology at the University of Twente. He came up with the idea for his business after being unable to get a takeaway delivery in North Holland for a birthday celebration with his family. It was not until 2003 that Groen quit his study as Takeaway.com entered a critical growth phase. In 2012, Groen raised €13 million to expand it as Takeaway.com to other countries. Groen took Takeaway.com public on the Euronext Amsterdam stock exchange in 2016, in order to fund expansion of Takeaway.com in Germany and other European countries.

In 2018, Groen took over Takeaway.com's main competitors in Germany from Delivery Hero. When Takeaway.com merged with British company Just Eat in 2020, Groen became chief executive of the merged organisation. Groen also owns 11.3% of the merged business; he previously owned 35% of Takeaway.com. In 2017, Quote magazine listed Groen as the Netherlands' richest self-made millionaire under 40. In 2018, he became a billionaire, as the interest on his Takeaway.com shares was over 1 billion euros. In 2021, Groen announced that all Just Eat workers would be entitled to minimum pay, sick pay and paid holiday, rather than being classed as gig workers.

In 2021 Groen responded to Uber CEO Dara Khosrowshahi, who criticized Groen for focusing his attention on his company's share price, by writing: "Start paying taxes, minimum wage and social security premiums before giving a founder advice on how he should run his business." As of October 2021, his net worth was estimated at US$1.2 billion, although this has since dropped to US$350 million as of June 2022.

Personal life
Groen lives in the Netherlands. In 2017, he bought a 9 bedroom house in Noordwijk that had had a guide price of €10.25 million. His hobby is flying and he has a pilot licence. Few details about Groen's personal life are publicly known.

References

1978 births
Living people
People from Delft
People from Hollands Kroon
Dutch billionaires
University of Twente alumni
Dutch company founders